is a Japanese stop-motion short anime series produced by Shin-Ei Animation and Japan Green Hearts in cooperation with Bandai Namco Entertainment. It aired in Japan on TV Tokyo through its Kinder TV children's variety program on January 5, 2021. The series' title is a play on the words  and car, which reflects the main characters. Upon its release, it was received positively by fans and critics due to its simple storyline in each episode.

A second season titled  aired between October 2022, and December 2022.

Series setting
The series is aired as a two-minute-plus short animation segment on the children's variety program Kinder TV. Each short focuses on a world where people drive sentient vehicles that are hybrids between guinea pigs and motor vehicles. Though each episode's story varies, the core focus of the series focuses on the Molcars' antics and sometimes a bit of solving problems for their friends and their drivers. Episodes sometimes include parodies of famous movie genres for comedic effect.

Characters
There are five named Molcars in the series as profiled in the show's website:

A male beige Molcar with orange patches. He is shown to be laid back but also ready to help anyone in need, something that is proven by helping out an ambulance Molcar weave through a traffic jam. Shown to like carrots.

A male white Molcar with a cowardly personality who easily gets into trouble. He yearns for Teddy "like an older sister", but his bad luck always leads him to trouble, from being hijacked to becoming a Zombie Molcar. Shown to like lettuce.

An off-white male Molcar with a spiky top and beginner's marks on the sides. He has a fear of cats which he had overcome with help from his friends. He also is profiled to be serious, curious, and extremely proud.

A female chocolate brown Molcar with flowers on her ears/side mirrors. Although profiled to be as somewhat of a fashionista, she is also shown to be strong and fit.

A female dark brown Molcar who is known to eat anything, including garbage. Profiled as a tomboy, she has also showed a fearless personality, being able to face the zombie horde with weapons in and teaming up with Choco on a rescue mission.

The second season, Pui Pui Molcar Driving School, adds newer lead characters:

A white Molcar with red patches who is profiled as one who cares about fashion. Her actions with Abbey causes her and the others to be sent back to driving school. Previously a minor character in the first season.

A light gray rookie Molcar currently enrolled at driving school.
Molcars working for the driving school.

Aside from the named Molcars mentioned above, there are also several other unnamed Molcars distinguished by their colors as well as main uses, with some Molcars functioning as ambulances, police patrol cars, and food stands. These unnamed Molcars are being retroactively given names and monikers through a series of Twitter posts as part of a countdown to the compilation movie's release. The show also depicts human and non-human characters, mostly depicted as faceless figurines, although in several episodes, interior shots are shown as limited live-action scenes where drivers and passengers are played by actors; the first episode alone sees portrayals by director Tomoki Misato and older sister Mizuho, herself an actress. The 10th episode introduces the fictional magical girl anime .

Development
Tomoki Misato is a stop motion animator and director born in Tokyo, Japan and graduated from Musashino Art University in 2016. Though he made short films, he became famous in the animation industry when he directed the award-winning short My Little Goat in 2018, which he produced over a ten-year period. It was praised by critics for both its animation and story.

As an upcoming director, he began working with Pui Pui Molcar after being approached by Noboru Sugiyama, the executive producer at Shin-Ei Animation in an offer with Bandai Namco Entertainment to produce a short animation series that would air as one of the segments in Kinder TV. His original plan was to create a 30-minute short film but decided to create an omnibus short series instead. According to Misato himself, the series' quirky design and animation as well as its premise came from an idea back in 2019. He recalled that "if the car were a cute guinea pig, will the frustrating events that occur while driving be solved?" He also added, "To act on a society that is easily swept away by people, I also want to convey the fun and importance of it." Almost all of the episodes of the series was directed and written by Misato himself, though he was assisted by an animation crew composed of four people at Japan Green Hearts alongside Hana Ono and many others. He did point out that "[he] was worried about how would the story turn out in each episode in a fixed length of 2 minutes and 40 seconds". Sugiyama also said "Unlike live-action films, there are no coincidences in the world of Pui Pui Molcar. When Director Misato creates a set, everything is arranged in a particular way for a purpose."

The series took a year and a half to produce. Majority of the characters in the series were made using cotton and wool, with some of the effects done using both cotton yarn and some flashlights. In addition, pixilation and time-lapse photography were also used in the series to include live-action actors inside the Molcars in some episodes, as well as recordings of real guinea pig squeaks for the Molcars' voices. The series also incorporates elements of traditional 2D animation in the form of snippets.

Media

Anime
Pui Pui Molcar aired in TV Tokyo as one of the segments in the Children's Variety Program Kinder TV on January 5, 2021. Each two-minute episode is aired at 7:30 AM. Bandai Namco Entertainment streams the show officially in YouTube for free. Muse Communication also licensed the series outside Japan to be aired also in YouTube in South and Southeast Asian territories. Netflix is streaming the series in North America and other select territories excluding some parts of Asia starting March 25, 2021. A second season aired on on TV Tokyo from October 8 to December 24, 2022, with Hana Ono directing the series and UchuPeople taking over as main animation studio from Japan Green Hearts.

Bandai Namco Arts, under the Bandai Visual label, released the first season of the series in both DVD and Blu-ray box sets on July 28, 2021.

Season 1 (2021)

Season 2 (2022)

Film
A Season 1 compilation film titled  was released in theaters on July 22, 2021. The compilation movie was dedicated to Koji Tsujitani (1962-2018) in the end credits.

Merchandise
Several merchandise tied to the series were released, with Eikoh announced the characters of the series will be released as part of the Mochikororin Plush Mascot line of mini plush toys on February 5, 2021. Good Smile Company released a Nendoroid figure of Potato first announced on Wonder Hobby 33
in April 2022, that has compatibility with certain recently released Nendoroid figures. The show has also announced a collaboration with Bandai Namco Filmworks to promote the release of Mobile Suit Gundam: The Witch from Mercury, accompanied with an artwork by JNTHED.

A virtual pet collaboration with Bandai's Tamagotchi, the "Pui Pui Molcartchi", was released in October 2021.

Video Game
A party game titled Pui Pui Molcar: Let's Molcar Party was released by Bandai Namco Entertainment in December 2021 for the Nintendo Switch.

Collaboration With Momoiro Clover Z

On March 10, 2023, a music video was published on the MomocloChan Z YouTube Channel (Momoiro Clover Z's channel targeted towards younger audiences such as preschoolers) titled "Pui Pui はとまらない" (Hepburn: Pui Pui Wa Tomaranai, Pui Pui Won't Stop) in collaboration with Pui Pui Molcar. In the video, both the Idols and the Molcars are shown dancing about, with the Molcars even being featured in the song, adding squeaky sound effects to the beat.

Reception
Upon the series' release, it was received positively by both fans and critics in Japan. Naoki Ogi, an educational critic, stated, "Reading the story from music, movements, and facial expressions in an anime without dialogue stimulates the imagination of children. The message is not explained in words, but is good from an educational point of view." She also added, "The current COVID-19 pandemic may actually influence the series' rise in its popularity." Hakusai Kobayashi of Famitsu also praised the show for its animation and simple storyline saying "It has a high degree of perfection as an animation work. I'm guessing that's the reason the show has become popular." Kodansha's Japanese automotive magazine Best Car has featured the series in a three-page article.

Reception outside Japan is just as positive. Kara Dennison of Otaku USA magazine stated, "Pui Pui Molcar doesn’t involve any dialogue (at least so far): just squeaks. And what makes it accessible for little kids also makes it accessible for international viewers." Leandre Grecia of Top Gear Philippines found Pui Pui Molcar enjoyable even for older viewers, saying it is "a feel-good no-dialogue series containing sub-three-minute episodes, and we dare say the entire show has a decent mix of comedy, drama, and action." Grecia also added that the show teaches children "some subtle lessons on social responsibility, which can help give kids an idea or two on how to act properly toward other people and animals, and the environment."

Alicia Haddick of Otaquest mentioned that among the reasons for the series' popularity in and out of Japan are the simplistic design and inviting setting along with the Molcar concept, commenting that "Turning [cars] into the equivalent of pets and having them act as such is also an ingenious move that only endears them to the audience." Haddick added that the simple designs have caused the show to spawn fan art easily shared in social media and provide "a blank slate to personalize with self-made designs that fit into the basic idea of a Molcar. ... All the while, as plentiful YouTube videos show, it’s easy to make a Molcar of your own."

The series also became a trending topic in Twitter in the month of January prior to its first airing. Japanese media review company Filmarks ranked the series first place of the most popular anime in the 2021 winter anime season, beating other popular series like SK8 the Infinity, Non Non Biyori Nonstop and World Trigger.

References

External links
  
 

2021 anime television series debuts
Animated television series about mammals
Anime with original screenplays
Bandai Namco franchises
Fictional cavies
Film and television memes
Japanese television series with live action and animation
Mass media franchises
Muse Communication
School life in anime and manga
Shin-Ei Animation
Stop-motion animated television series
TV Tokyo original programming
Works about cars